Phillip Trent  (October 16, 1907, Wilkes-Barre, Pennsylvania – January 24, 2001, Englewood, New Jersey) was an American stage and film actor. He began his career on Broadway and starred in nine stage productions. He appeared in numerous films during the 1930s and 1940s. He also appeared as Clifford Jones.

Filmography
Some of Trent's films include:

 Trick for Trick (1933) - David Adams
 The Man who Dared (1933) - Dick (as Clifford Jones)
 The Power and the Glory (1933) - Tom Garner Jr. (as Clifford Jones)
 Tillie and Gus (1933) - Tom Sheridan
 Coming Out Party (1934) - Jimmy Wolverton
 The Crime of Helen Stanley (1934) - Larry King (as Clifford Jones)
 The Most Precious Thing in Life (1934) - Fraternity Conductor (uncredited)
 Transient Lady (1935) - Fred Baxter
 Princess O'Hara (1935) - Tad (as Clifford Jones)
 Strangers All (1935) - Patrick Gruen (as Clifford Jones)
 His Family Tree (1935) - Dudley Weatherby
 Don't Gamble with Love (1936) - Bob Grant
 Wife vs. Secretary (1936) - Elevator Boy (uncredited)
 For the Service (1936) - George Murphy
 Parole! (1936) - Gregory
 The Girl on the Front Page (1936) - Edward
 The Public Pays (1936, Short) - MGM Reporter (uncredited)
 I Promise to Pay (1937) - Davis (uncredited)
 The Great Gambini (1937) - Reporter (uncredited)
 Youth on Parole (1937) - Don (uncredited)
 That's My Story (1937) - Reporter (uncredited)
 A Doctor's Diary (1937) 
 The Spy Ring (1938) - Captain Robert Scott
 Letter of Introduction (1938) - Man at Barry's Party (uncredited)
 I Am the Law (1938) - Law Student (uncredited)
 Flirting with Fate (1938) - Larry
 Pirates of the Skies (1939) - Pilot (uncredited)
 Let Us Live (1939) - Frank Burke
 Buck Rogers (1939, Serial) - Mitchell [Ch. 1] (uncredited)
 When Tomorrow Comes (1939) - Service Man (uncredited)
 Drunk Driving (1939, Short) - MGM Crime Reporter (uncredited)
 Gone with the Wind (1939) - Gentleman / Bearded Confederate on Steps of Tara (uncredited)
 Ninotchka (1939)
 The Green Hornet (1940, Serial) - Jasper Jenks
 Those Were the Days! (1940) - Clerk (uncredited)
 The Great Train Robbery (1941) - Carbine (uncredited)
 Back in the Saddle (1941) - Jack (uncredited)
 Paper Bullets (1941) - Harold DeWitt
 Murder by Invitation (1941) - Larry Denham
 Outlaws of Cherokee Trail (1941) - Fake Jim Warren
 Bombay Clipper (1942) - Tom Hare (final film role)

References

External links
 Phillip Trent at IMDb

1907 births
2001 deaths
20th-century American male actors
American male film actors
American male stage actors